Bauera rubioides, commonly known as river rose, dog rose or wiry bauera,<ref name="RBGV">{{cite web |last1=Walsh |first1=Neville G. |title=Bauera rubioides''' |url=https://vicflora.rbg.vic.gov.au/flora/taxon/8173cfc7-1094-45df-8839-c33198e379e7 |publisher=Royal Botanic Gardens Victoria |access-date=18 December 2021}}</ref> is a species of flowering plant in the family Cunoniaceae and is endemic to south-eastern Australia. It is a scrambling, tangled shrub with wiry branches, trifoliate, usually toothed leaves, and pink or white flowers. 

Flowering mostly occurs in spring and summer.

TaxonomyBauera rubioides was first formally described in 1801 by Henry Cranke Andrews in The Botanist's Repository for New, and Rare Plants. Andrews noted "...the whole plant has, at first sight, much the appearance of a Rubus." John Sims recorded in Curtis's Botanical Magazine that "...the trivial name is derived from the resemblance which it bears, especially in its young state, to a Rubia, not a Rubus, as Mr. Andrews, with his usual accuracy, would have it."

Distribution and habitat
River rose grows in wet, often shaded areas in south-eastern Queensland, the coast and ranges of New South Wales, in southern Victoria, south-eastern South Australia and it is common in Tasmania.

Use in horticultureBauera rubioides'' is readily grown from cuttings and is hardy in moist, well-drained soil in full sun or light shade.

References 

Cunoniaceae
Oxalidales of Australia
Flora of New South Wales
Flora of Victoria (Australia)
Flora of Tasmania
Flora of Queensland
Plants described in 1801
Taxa named by Henry Charles Andrews